Círculo Universitario de Quilmes, commonly shortnamed as CUQ, is an Argentine rugby union club sited in Quilmes, Buenos Aires. 

The rugby union team currently plays in Primera División B, the second division of the URBA league system.

Titles

Men's field hockey
Primera División (1):
 1992

References

External links
 Twitter site

Rugby union clubs in Buenos Aires Province
Rugby clubs established in 1938
1938 establishments in Argentina